Agyneta levii is a species of sheet weaver spider (family Linyphiidae) found in Russia. It was described by Tanasevitch in 1984.

References

levii
Spiders of Russia
Spiders described in 1984